Man from Cocody is a French adventure film from 1965 set in Cocody, Ivory Coast. It was directed by Christian-Jaque, written by Christian-Jaque, Jean Ferry and Jacques Emmanuel, starring Jean Marais. The film was known under the titles: Ivory Coast Adventure (USA),  (Italy),  (Germany).

Cast 
 Jean Marais as Jean-Luc Hervé de la Tommeraye
 Liselotte Pulver as Baby
 Philippe Clay as Renaud Lefranc
 Nancy Holloway as Nancy
 Maria Grazia Buccella as Angelina
 Jacques Morel as Rouffignac
 Robert Dalban as Pepe
 Gil Delamare

References 

1965 films
Italian adventure films
French adventure films
1960s French-language films
Films directed by Christian-Jaque
1965 adventure films
French spy comedy films
Films set in Ivory Coast
1960s French films
1960s Italian films